The Festival Winds was a Canadian Harmonie ensemble, which appeared at the Festival of the Sound, a summer music festival based in the resort town of Parry Sound, Ontario from 1988 to 2014.

The group specialized in the performance of Harmoniemusik, a historical genre written for the small wind ensemble called the Harmonie.  The Festival Winds made the first recording of the first editions of Harmoniemusik the Harmoniemusik of K.V. Anhang C, works attributed to Wolfgang Amadeus Mozart.

The members of the ensemble were:

 James Mason, Brian James, oboes
 James Campbell, David Bourque, clarinets
 James McKay (bassoon), Christian Sharpe, bassoons
 James Sommerville, Neil Spaulding, horns
 Joel Quarrington, bass

As of 2021, James Mason is the Principal Oboe of the Kitchener-Waterloo Symphony and Canadian Chamber Ensemble. Brian James is Second Oboe and Solo English Horn with Symphony Nova Scotia, and instructor of oboe at the Fountain School of the Performing Arts at Dalhousie University. Neil Spaulding teaches French Horn at Queen's University at Kingston and is Second Horn with the Hamilton Philharmonic Orchestra. Joel Quarrington teaches at the University of Ottawa and is a Visiting Artist at the Royal Academy of Music in London. James Campbell, who has been the festival's Artistic Director since 1988, teaches at the Jacobs School of Music at Indiana University, as does David Bourque, who also teaches at the University of Toronto. James McKay is Professor Emeritus at the Don Wright Faculty of Music at the University of Western Ontario. James Sommerville is the principal hornist for the Boston Symphony Orchestra.

References

Wind bands
Canadian classical music groups